Kinugasa Stadium was a major league baseball stadium in Japan.  The Shochiku Robins played there.

References

Defunct baseball venues in Japan
Sports venues in Tokyo